Richard William Palmer-James (born 11 June 1947) is an English guitarist, songwriter and lyricist. He may be best known as one of the founder members of Supertramp (playing guitar and songwriter); writing lyrics for several songs by the progressive rock group King Crimson in the early 1970s; and for writing lyrics for the 1985 hit "(I'll Never Be) Maria Magdalena" by Sandra.

Palmer-James was born in Meyrick Park, Bournemouth, where he got his start in the music business playing in various local bands: The Corvettes, The Palmer-James Group (formed with Alec James), Tetrad, and Ginger Man, all of which included John Wetton on bass and vocals. He was a founding member of Supertramp, playing guitar and singing vocals, as well as writing the lyrics for their self-titled debut album under the name Richard Palmer. He also co-wrote the lyrics of "Goldrush", a song written during his days in the band but not recorded until their 2002 album Slow Motion.

Palmer wrote lyrics for three of King Crimson's albums: Larks' Tongues in Aspic, Starless and Bible Black, and Red. He did not participate in any of King Crimson's recordings, but worked with John Wetton and David Cross after Robert Fripp disbanded the group in 1974.

Palmer has lived in Munich since the early 1970s. In 1978 he was visited by John Wetton and W.J. Hutcheson, his bandmates in Tetrad. Over 10 days, with the German drummer Curt Cress, they recorded, as "Jack-Knife", an album of songs from the early days called I Wish You Would. He wrote the English lyrics for La Bionda the Italo Disco inventors. Palmer-James also wrote lyrics for the La Bionda-associated disco group D.D.Sound in the late 70s.

In 1997 he released a CD with former bandmate John Wetton, Monkey Business, a compilation of unreleased material including some songs that were recorded for the first time in studio, including a King Crimson tune called "Doctor Diamond".

Selected discography 

 Supertramp 
 1970 : Supertramp (album)
 2002 : Slow Motion : One of his compositions, "Goldrush", is featured here.

 Emergency 
 1973 : Get Out to the Country

 King Crimson 
 1973 : Larks' Tongues in Aspic
 1974 : Starless & Bible Black
 1974 : Red

 D.D.Sound 
 1977 : Disco Delivery - lyricist on all four albums
 1977 : 1-2-3-4... Gimme Some More!
 1978 : Café
 1979 : The Hootchie Coochie

 Munich 
 1979 : Sideshow/Wednesday - Single - The song "Sideshow" was written by Palmer-James & Hermann Weindorf.

 Jack Knife 
 1979 : I Wish You Would - With John Wetton.

 Pan Demonium 
 1979 : Start the Fire - co-composer of two songs: "Walking on Air" and "Touch Me"

 Eruption 
 1983 : Our Way - co-composer of two songs: "Big Bang" and "In 1000 years"

 John Wetton 
 1998 : Arkangel - With Robert Fripp, Steve Hackett, etc. 
 2011 : Raised in captivity - The song "The Devil and the Opera House" was co-written by Palmer-James, John Wetton & Billy Sherwood.

 John Wetton & Richard Palmer-James 
 1998 : Monkey Business 1972 - 1997
 2014 : Jack-Knife / Monkey Business 1972 - 1997

 Richard Palmer-James 
 2016 : Takeaway

References

Sources
 Discography, discogs.com; accessed 10 June 2017.

External links
Rough English translation of an interview with Richard Palmer-James in Tylko Rock

King Crimson members
Supertramp members
Musicians from Bournemouth
English songwriters
Living people
1947 births
English expatriates in Germany
English rock guitarists
English male singers
Lead guitarists
English male guitarists